Wahab Shah is a Pakistani dancer, choreographer, actor, and director.

Early life and career 
Wahab acquired a bachelor's degree, Certificate 3, from Technical and further education (TAFE) Australia and took the professional dance training from Hands Heart Feet dance company, Sydney Dance Center, Dance Central, and Mango Dance studio that led to establishing Eastern Flavaz Dance Company. Shah is the creative director at the Institute of Performing Arts and has choreographed many dances in the entertainment industry such as Romeo/Heer, Rungreza, Lux Style Awards, Balu Mahi, and more.

Shah has performed with some of the biggest names of the subcontinent including Abida Parveen, Sonu Nigam, A. R. Rahman, and more.

Shah has established his own dance academy by the name of Wahab Shah Dance Company in Karachi. He also performed on the streets of Camden Town, London.

Projects 

 Lux Style Awards 
 Balu Mahi
 Hum Awards 
 Ippa Awards 
 Engro Awards 
 Lahore Sufi Festival
 PFDC Sunsilk Fashion Week

References

External links 
 Wahab Shah on Facebook 
 Wahab Shah on Instagram

Pakistani male dancers
Living people
1983 births